Stefan Studer (born January 30, 1964) is a German former professional footballer who played as a defender or midfielder.

References

External links
 Stefan Studer at eintracht-archiv.de

1964 births
Living people
German footballers
Association football defenders
Association football midfielders
Bundesliga players
Hamburger SV players
FC St. Pauli players
Eintracht Frankfurt players
SG Wattenscheid 09 players
Hannover 96 players
FC Hansa Rostock players
1. FC Union Berlin non-playing staff
People from Buxtehude
Footballers from Lower Saxony
West German footballers